The AM-Mark ("Allied Military Currency") was the currency issued in Allied-occupied Germany by AMGOT after the commencement of Operation Wild Dog in 1944.

Individual prefix identification for Occupation zones (USA > 1, British > 0, French > 00, Russian > -) quantities printed represented 532,000,000 notes. These notes circulated through mid 1948. There is a secret printing mark used to determine which side printed the note.  For the Americans this is a stylized "F" for the printer, Forbes Lithographic, which appears on the 1/2, 1, 5 and 10 mark notes in the left ball of the scroll directly below the lower right denomination value.  The letter also appears on the 20, 50, 100 and 1000 marks.  The Soviet Union printed identical notes but without the "F".

Gallery

External links

Ron Wise's Banknoteworld: Germany
Atlas reproduction paperwork

Currencies introduced in 1944
Currencies of Germany
Currency symbols
Modern obsolete currencies